Bouquet of Black Orchids is a 1993 The Tear Garden compilation created by Nettwerk Europe for the European market. It contains songs from The Tear Garden's first two LPs (Tired Eyes Slowly Burning, The Last Man to Fly) and first two EPs (The Tear Garden, Sheila Liked the Rodeo).

Track listing
Sheila Liked the Rodeo – 4:45
Ophelia – 8:36
Tear Garden – 4:51
My Thorny Thorny Crown – 3:57
Romulus and Venus – 6:09
White Coats & Haloes – 2:21
Blobbo – 4:18
Sybil the Spider Consumes Himself – 4:26
A Ship Named 'Despair' – 3:41
The Centre Bullet – 9:46
You and Me and Rainbows – 16:46
OO Ee OO – 5:16

Notes
Tracks 1, 7, and 8 originally on the EP Sheila Liked the Rodeo
Tracks 2, 3, 4 and 10 originally on the EP The Tear Garden
Tracks 5, 6, and 9 originally on the LP The Last Man to Fly
Tracks 11 and 12 originally on the LP Tired Eyes Slowly Burning

The Tear Garden albums
1993 compilation albums
Nettwerk Records compilation albums